Arthur Gue Cissé (born 29 December 1996) is an Ivorian professional sprinter specializing in the sprints. He owns the Ivorian national records in the 60 m, 100 m, 150 m, and 200 m distances, including a sub-10 second time of 9.93 s in the 100 m. He has won several medals at the international level including a gold medal in the 2015 African Games  relay and a silver medal in the 2018 African Championships 100 m.

He became the 131st man to break the 10-second barrier in the 100 m on 16 June 2018, setting a national record of 9.94 s. He is coached by Anthony Koffi, the coach of fellow Ivorian sprinters and Olympians Ben Youssef Meïté and Marie-Josée Ta Lou.

Statistics
Information from World Athletics profile unless otherwise noted.

Personal bests

International championship results

1Representing Africa

Circuit wins
Diamond League
Doha: 2020 (200 m)
World Athletics Indoor Tour (60 m)
Madrid: 2021

100 m seasonal bests

Notes

References

External links

1996 births
Living people
Ivorian male sprinters
Athletes (track and field) at the 2015 African Games
African Games gold medalists for Ivory Coast
African Games silver medalists for Ivory Coast
African Games medalists in athletics (track and field)
Athletes (track and field) at the 2019 African Games
Athletes (track and field) at the 2020 Summer Olympics
Olympic athletes of Ivory Coast
Islamic Solidarity Games medalists in athletics